The Asian Television Award for Best Actor in a Leading Role is awarded annually by the Asian Television Awards.

Winners and nominees

Asian awards
Television awards for Best Actor